Giannis Laios (born ) is a retired Greek male volleyball player and volleyball coach. He has 217 appearances with Greece men's national volleyball team. He played for Olympiacos for 12 years (1973-1985), winning 7 Greek Championships and 2 Greek Cups. After his retirement, he became head coach of Olympiacos for seven seasons (winter 1987-1992, 1995-1996) and coached the club to 6 Greek Championships, 3 Greek Cups and most importantly the 1995–96 CEV Cup Winners Cup.

Clubs
  Olympiacos (1973-1985)
  Panathinaikos (1985-1986)

References

1951 births
Living people
Greek men's volleyball players
Olympiacos S.C. players
Olympiacos S.C. coaches
Panathinaikos V.C. players
Volleyball players from Athens